Drežnik is a settlement west of Vinica in the Municipality of Črnomelj in the White Carniola area of southeastern Slovenia. The area is part of the traditional region of Lower Carniola and is now included in the Southeast Slovenia Statistical Region.

Name
Drežnik was first mentioned in written sources in 1485 as Dresnigk. The name is derived from the Slavic word *dręzga 'forest, thicket'. Place names of similar origin include Drežnica and Dresden.

References

External links
Drežnik on Geopedia

Populated places in the Municipality of Črnomelj